Jouret may refer to
Jouret (surname)
Jouret Bedran, a village and municipality in Lebanon 
Jouret el ballout, a village in Lebanon
Jouret el-Termos, a village and municipality in Lebanon
Chahtoul-Jouret Mhad, a municipality in Lebanon